Ronal Céliz Milian (born 30 August 1983) is a Peruvian footballer who plays as a striker for Torneo Descentralizado club Ayacucho FC.

Club career
Céliz played for Copa Perú side Defensor Porvenir in 2008.

Then he played for Universitario Trujillo in the 2009 season.

In January 2010 he started playing for Unión Comercio in the 2010 Copa Perú season.
He helped his side win the title that season and thus promotion to the Torneo Descentralizado.

Celiz made his debut in the Descentralizado in the First Round of the 2011 season away to Alianza Lima. Manager Hernán Lisi allowed him to play the entire match, but it finished in a 4–1 win for Alianza Lima.

References

External links

1983 births
Living people
People from Tarapoto
Association football forwards
Peruvian footballers
Unión Comercio footballers
Club Deportivo Universidad de San Martín de Porres players
Sport Huancayo footballers
Peruvian Primera División players